The Bofors Gun is a 1968 British drama film directed by Jack Gold and starring Nicol Williamson, David Warner, Ian Holm and John Thaw. It was based on the play Events While Guarding the Bofors Gun by John McGrath. It is set in 1954, during the British peacetime occupation of West Germany following the Second World War. It portrays the increasingly violent interaction between members of a squad of soldiers during a single night of guard duty.

Its budget was an estimated $800,000.

Plot
West Germany, 1954. Lance Bombardier Evans, a sheltered middle-class National Serviceman, is about to be sent back to England to undertake a second attempt at officer training. But first he has to get through one night of guard duty without incident. Evans is in charge of a section of six men detailed to guard an anti-aircraft Bofors gun at a British military base. It soon becomes clear that none of the section, with the exception of Flynn, have any respect for Evans, guessing rightly that the latter has no enthusiasm and little ability in his role. Gunner O'Rourke in particular is troublesome and insubordinate, his contempt for Evans spurring him to test the authority and patience of the weak-willed non-commissioned officer (NCO). Evans' fumbling attempts to engage him in friendly conversation only make matters worse. The atmosphere grows more tense and O'Rourke strikes one of the other men, Rowe and then dares Evans to place him on a disciplinary charge but the NCO is too nervously intimidated to do so. O'Rourke and his sidekick Featherstone insist on being allowed to go to the NAAFI to buy cigarettes and Evans ill-advisedly lets them go.

O'Rourke confides to Featherstone that at midnight it will be his 30th birthday and the two decide to go the canteen and start drinking, knowing full well it is forbidden whilst on guard duty. O'Rourke, having endured a grim childhood and the harsh, unjust punishments of the army for all his adult life, is at breaking point. Drunk and unstable, he tries to kill himself by jumping out of an upper story  window but only suffers minor injuries. Evans refuses to report the incident but not out of any genuine concern for O'Rourke but rather out of fear that it impact on his chances of becoming an officer. Sgt Walker, a much stronger NCO, arrives on a visit only to find Evans has apparently lost control of his section. Walker, aware of Evans' lack of experience, is prepared to turn a blind eye to the mess provided Evans disciplines O'Rourke. Evans refuses, prompting Walker to warn him that when he returns, he will bring the duty officer with him and that Evans had better have his section back in order. An exasperated Flynn tries to convince Evans that he needs to exert some authority and that his attempts to win O'Rourke over by being lenient will not work.

O'Rourke and Featherstone, drunk and disheveled, finally return. Ignoring Flynn's advice to report them, Evans is still convinced he can retrieve the situation himself and he puts O'Rourke on guard duty. Walker and Lieutenant Pickering arrive for the nightly inspection when Evans is checking on O'Rourke, still trying to talk him round. O'Rourke angrily accuses Evans of caring more about his own chances of becoming an officer than he does about the welfare of his own men. Evans admits that this is true, saying that becoming an officer represents his only chance of going home. O'Rourke threatens to attempt suicide again but Evans is too preoccupied with his own problems to really hear him. Walker orders the section to assemble for inspection and Evans goes back to the guard hut only to be ordered to fetch O'Rourke. He goes back to the Bofors gun only to discover that O'Rourke has stripped to the waist and fatally stabbed himself in the abdomen with a bayonet. Evans angrily kicks O'Rourke's corpse, knowing that his chances of going back to England are ruined. Walker and Lt Pickering arrive and Evans, now destined to spend the rest of his service in the ranks, has to face the full force of military punishment.

Cast
 Nicol Williamson as Gunner O'Rourke
 Ian Holm as Gunner Flynn
 David Warner as Lance Bombardier Terry "Lance Bar" Evans
 Peter Vaughan as Sgt. Walker
 John Thaw as Gunner Featherstone
 Barry Jackson as Gunner Shone
 Richard O'Callaghan as Gunner Rowe
 Gareth Forwood as Lt. Pickering
 Donald Gee as Gunner Crowley
 Barbara Jefford as NAAFI Girl
 Geoffrey Hughes as Pte. Samuel, cook
 John Herrington as German Pointer
 Lindsay Campbell as Captain Cheeseman
 Glynn Edwards as Sergeant-Major West

Critical reception
Vincent Canby, writing in The New York Times in 1968, praised the film, stating that it "played with such unaffected honesty ... I totally accepted its high-pitched, stylised reality." Canby also praised the performances of both Warner and Williamson, describing the latter's performance as O'Rourke as "a man who has peered over the edge of his soul and seen a terrible void. During this night, O'Rourke is preparing to jump into that void—and to take Bombardier Evans with him. How he destroys Evans—using the man's own vanities—is the story of the film."

A review in Variety in 1968 was also positive. "It has all the gripping fascination of a tussle between two wily, desperate young animals. Taut, icy direction and acting flawlessly ... bring a faultless realism."

A review in The Spectator in 1968 was negative: "Nicol Williamson's high-voltage performance is obviously plugged in to some private dynamo: he clears the ground around him, turns it into a kind of disaster area, persuades you that something ominous and intolerable is about to happen. But as he shouts and David Warner shivers, the splenetic confrontation seems to be between actors rather than valid characters."

Nominations
Nicol Williamson received a nomination for Best Actor at the 1969 BAFTAs for his performance as O'Rourke. Ian Holm won the BAFTA for Best Supporting Actor.

References

External links

1968 films
1968 drama films
British drama films
British films based on plays
Bushey Studios films
Films about the British Armed Forces
Films directed by Jack Gold
Films scored by Carl Davis
Films set in the 1950s
Films set in West Germany
Universal Pictures films
1960s English-language films
1960s British films